Del Valle Regional Park is a part of the East Bay Regional Park District (EBRPD) in an unincorporated region of Alameda County, California,  south of the city of Livermore. The park covers 4,316 acres (~17.47 km2., ~6.74 sq. mi.).

Geography

Overview 
The park largely surrounds Lake Del Valle, an artificial reservoir made in 1968 by damming Arroyo Valle, a small river. The lake provides a source of recreation for visitors including swimming, fishing, and boating. There are lifeguards present at designated swimming areas.

The park also offers 28 miles (~45.1 km) of hiking, horseback, and bicycle trails, in addition to 150 camping sites. It is the eastern gate for the Ohlone Wilderness Trail, which leads to Sunol and Mission Peak Regional Parks.

Trails 
The park, like many East Bay Regional Parks, has numerous trails. One trail, the East Shore Trail, leads from the Arroyo Road staging area to a ridge above Del Valle, and then follows the lake for several miles toward the boat launch. The Sailor Camp Trail leads to the Ohlone Wilderness Trail, and an unnamed trail leads to Mendenhall Road.

Access to the park

By car 
The park can be approached from Del Valle Park Road (via Mines Road) or Arroyo Road, where the parking meter is often broken. Del Valle Road connects to the southern end of the park, while Arroyo Road connects to the northern staging area.

Mines Road can be reached from Tesla Road (J2) and the California State Route 130. Arroyo Road can be reached from Concannon Boulevard and Wetmore Road.

By foot 
You can reach the Arroyo staging area along a narrow footpath which connects to Sycamore Grove Park and the general LARPD (Livermore Area Recreation and Park District) trail network.

History

Early years 
Construction crews began work on the lake in 1966. The construction of Del Valle Reservoir was finished in 1968. Del Valle Regional Park was opened to the public in 1970, 36 years after the EBRPD was founded in 1934.

Weather

California drought in the 2010s 
In the early- to mid-2010s, a severe drought struck the California region, including the East Bay; this caused 12 million trees in California to die. The East Bay Regional Park District wrote an article to help with the drought.

Flooding in the 2016-2017 winter 
Shortly after the California drought in the 2010s, Del Valle Regional Park suffered widespread damage from the unusually heavy rains and La Niña that struck the East Bay in early 2017. Much of the damage was around Lake Del Valle, where runoff overflowed five times into beaches, campgrounds and picnic areas. Some of the trails were washed out and needed to be rebuilt. The park was closed for nearly three months, before reopening on April 15, 2017. EBRPD estimated the cost to repair this park alone at $1.8 billion, and said the cost would rise further if the rains continued.

With another La Niña scheduled for the 2017-2018 winter, it seemed quite possible that repairs would have to be done after that winter as well.

2019 flooding 
In early 2019, heavy rains again came to the Del Valle Regional Park area, and as a result, the park closed in mid-February 2019. It was scheduled to re-open in early March.

Algae 
Lake Del Valle has in the past had a problem with dangerous algae, and during the 2015/2016 winter, swimming was banned in the lake.

Gallery

See also

 Lake Del Valle

References

External links

Del Valle Park at the EBRPD website

East Bay Regional Park District
Parks in Alameda County, California
Protected areas established in 1968
1968 establishments in California